Way Back Home: Live from Rochester, NY is an album of jazz music by the Steve Gadd Band, recorded live at the 2015 Rochester International Jazz Festival in Gadd's hometown. It was nominated for the 2017 Grammy Award for Best Contemporary Instrumental Album.

References

2016 live albums
Live jazz albums
Jazz albums by American artists